The 1947–48 Divizia B was the ninth season of the second tier of the Romanian football league system.

The format was changed from three series to four series, each one of them having 16 teams. The winners of the series were supposed to promote in the Divizia A, but finally only two of them promoted. Next season (1948–49) the format would be changed again, this time in two series of 14 teams, therefore in this season relegated all the teams ranked below the 7th place, a total of 36 teams (9x4) plus the worst two ranked on the 7th place.

Team changes

To Divizia B
Promoted from Divizia C
 Concordia Ploiești
 BNR București
 Astra Română Poiana Câmpina
 PCA Constanța
 Indagrara Arad
 Ripensia Timișoara
 Sanitas Satu Mare
 CFR Cluj
 Șoimii Sibiu
 Doljul Craiova
 Aninoasa
 Danubiana Roman
 Astra Română Moreni
 CFR Târgoviște
 Minaur Baia Mare
 Franco-Româna Brăila
 Metalosport Ferdinand
 Tisa Sighet
 Sticla Târnăveni
 ARLUS Bacău
 23 August București
 CFR Iași
 UF Hunedoara
 Explosivii Făgăraș
 CFR Brașov

Relegated from Divizia A
 Prahova Ploiești
 Craiova

From Divizia B
Relegated to Divizia C
 Sparta București
 Feroemail Ploiești

Promoted to Divizia A
 Unirea Tricolor București
 Ploiești
 Dermata Cluj
 Karres Mediaș

Enrolled teams 
CFR Buzău and Dinamo Suceava were enrolled directly in the second division.

Excluded teams 
Victoria Cluj was dissolved at the end of the previous season and was excluded from Divizia B.

Renamed teams 
23 August București was renamed as Metalochimic București.

IAR Brașov was renamed as Tractorul Brașov.

23 August Lugoj was renamed as CSM Lugoj.

Other teams 
Șoimii Sibiu merged with Sportul CFR Sibiu and the team was renamed as Șoimii CFR Sibiu.

Prahova Ploiești and Concordia Ploiești merged, the second one being absorbed by the first one, but Prahova changed its name in Concordia Ploiești, the name of the factory that became the main sponsor of the team.

Sanitas Satu Mare and Olimpia CFR Satu Mare merged, Sanitas being absorbed by Olimpia which was also renamed simply as CFR Satu Mare.

League tables

Serie I

Serie II

Serie III

Serie IV

See also 

 1947–48 Divizia A

References

Liga II seasons
Romania
2